Fritz Zwazl (born 26 June 1926) is an Austrian former swimmer. He competed in the men's 100 metre backstroke at the 1948 Summer Olympics.

References

External links
 

1926 births
Possibly living people
Olympic swimmers of Austria
Swimmers at the 1948 Summer Olympics
Place of birth missing (living people)
Austrian male backstroke swimmers